The Supreme Hockey League (SHL) (Vysshaya hokkeinaya liga (VHL)), also known as the Major Hockey League or Higher Hockey League (HHL), is a professional ice hockey league in Eurasia, and the second highest level of Russian hockey.

History
Though currently acting independently, plans were in place to convert it to a farm system for the Kontinental Hockey League (KHL)'s 2010–11 season. It was preceded by the Major League of the Russian Championship (Vysshaya Liga) that formerly held a relegation role for the Russian Superleague, and was governed by the Ice Hockey Federation of Russia. As of the 2017–18 season, some VHL teams were affiliated with a KHL team (e.g. HC Sarov is affiliated with KHL's Torpedo), while other teams of the VHL are not affiliated with a KHL team.

Russian Classic
The Russian Classic is an outdoor ice hockey game that is played during the Supreme Hockey League regular season. So far, the visiting team has won every edition of the game.

Seasons overview

Teams in 2022–23

All-time team records
Since its foundation in 2010, 40 different clubs have played in the VHL, and 34 of them have at least once qualified for the playoffs. Only one club (Toros Neftekamsk) has made the playoffs in all nine championships of the VHL, reaching the semi-final stage six times. The table gives the final regular-season ranks for all teams, with the playoff performance encoded in colors. The teams are ordered by their best championship results.

See also
Kontinental Hockey League
VHL-B
Junior Hockey League
National Junior Hockey League

References

External links
VHL Official 
VHL Official 
VHL Official
AllHockey.Ru
Euro Hockey

 
 
Russia
Sports leagues in Russia
Professional ice hockey leagues in Russia